Homer L. Pearson (December 31, 1900 – June 9, 1985) was an American politician who served as the 30th Lieutenant Governor of Colorado from 1947 to 1949 under Governor William Lee Knous.

References

1900 births
1985 deaths
Lieutenant Governors of Colorado
20th-century American politicians
Colorado Democrats